Following the 2017 election, the The Alternative would secure its first, and only to date, head mayor position in a Danish municipality. Sofie Valbjørn, who was the only one elected to the council from The Alternative
in 2017, would become mayor, after there was support between the Social Democrats, Venstre, The Alternative and local party Miljølisten.

In January 2021, Sofie Valbjørn announced that she would not stand for re-election in protest for what she called "extremely poor cooperation" between the parties.

For this election, Danish Social Liberal Party would stand for the first time since 2009, while the Red–Green Alliance would stand for the first time since the 2007 municipal reform. Frank Jensen from the Danish Social Liberal Party, would lead the party to winning 4 of the 11 seats, which would see the party become the largest in the council. He would eventually gain support, to replace Sofie Valbjørn from the The Alternative,
who on the contrary, lost representation in the council.

Electoral system
For elections to Danish municipalities, a number varying from 9 to 31 are chosen to be elected to the municipal council. The seats are then allocated using the D'Hondt method and a closed list proportional representation.
Fanø Municipality had 11 seats in 2021

Unlike in Danish General Elections, in elections to municipal councils, electoral alliances are allowed.

Electoral alliances  

Electoral Alliance 1

Electoral Alliance 2

Electoral Alliance 3

Results

Notes

References 

Fanø